A Noble Spirit (Chinese: 天上的菊美) is a 2014 Chinese biographical documentary film directed by Miao Yue and starring Ngawang Rinchen, Maggie Jiang and Chen Jin.

Cast
Ngawang Rinchen
Jiang Shuying
Chen Jin

References

2014 films
2010s biographical films
2014 documentary films
Biographical documentary films
Chinese biographical films
Chinese documentary films